American Promise is a national, non-profit, non-partisan, grassroots organization that advocates for a 28th Amendment to the United States Constitution that would allow the U.S. Congress and states to set reasonable limits on campaign spending in U.S. Elections. Founded in 2016 by Jeff Clements, the former assistant attorney general of Massachusetts, and author of Corporations Are Not People: Reclaiming Democracy From Big Money and Global Corporations, American Promise advocates for campaign finance reform in the United States.

Ballot initiatives and resolutions

Since the U.S. Supreme Court ruling in 2010's Citizens United v. FEC, grassroots organizations have helped 20 states and over 800 cities and towns to pass resolutions calling on Congress to propose a 28th Amendment to overturn that ruling.  Voters in Montana, Colorado, California, and Washington have passed resolutions by voter instruction or ballot initiative with significant cross-partisan support.

Since its launch in 2016, American Promise has engaged in statewide efforts in Wyoming and Massachusetts to put initiatives on the ballot in 2018.

28th Amendment Pledge

The American Promise Candidate Pledge asks local, state and federal candidates and elected officials to pledge to use their office to advance the 28th Amendment to secure fair and free elections by limiting the amount of money spent to influence elections.

Ready to ratify
In states that have passed voter instructions or ballot initiatives calling on Congress to pass the 28th Amendment, American Promise works with citizens to prepare their state for the ratification of the 28th Amendment. In states like Colorado, Montana, California, and Washington, they are working to pass local resolutions asking their elected officials to follow the will of the voters.  In Massachusetts, a local affiliate group called People Govern, Not Money is leading an all-volunteer effort to place an initiative of the 2018 ballot that would ask voters to create a volunteer 15 member cross-partisan citizens commission that would be tasked with advancing policies to amend the U.S. Constitution to overturn the U.S. Supreme Court's ruling in Citizens United v. FEC.

National Citizenship Leadership Conference

In 2016, hundreds of people from across the country traveled to Washington, D.C. for the first annual National Citizen Leadership Conference.  The keynote speakers included Former Representative Jim Leach, Former Representative Donna Edwards, and Former State Senator Nina Turner.  At the Conference, American Promise gave out four Congressional Leadership Awards and four Citizen Leadership Awards.

Congressional Leadership Awards
The Congressional Leadership Awards recognize leaders in Congress who are committed to building cross-partisan alliances to advance a 28th Amendment to the Constitution to overturn Citizens United v. FEC 
Recipients of the first annual Congressional Leadership Award include: 
 retired Congressman Jim Leach (R-IA)
 Congresswoman Donna Edwards (D-MD)
 Congressman Walter Jones (R-NC)
 Congressman Jim McGovern (D-MA)

Advisory council

American Promise's cross-partisan advisory council includes Doris Kearns Goodwin, former state senator Nina Turner, John Pudner, Ben Cohen, Donnel Baird, Judy Wicks, former Congressman Jim Leach, Justice James C. Nelson, Matt Patsky, former governor of Massachusetts Michael Dukakis, former senator Alan Simpson, Kahlil Byrd, Rev. Dr. Katharine Henderson, Ella McGrail, Joe Kearns Goodwin, Robert Monks, Jack Doty, Tamara Piety, and Professor John Coates.

References

Campaign finance reform in the United States